FESC may refer to:

 Fellow of the European Society of Cardiology, title awarded by the European Society of Cardiology to healthcare professionals
 Fundación de Estudios Superiores Comfanorte, Colombian university in the city of Cúcuta, Norte de Santander